

A10A Insulins and analogues

A10AB Insulins and analogues for injection, fast-acting
A10AB01 Insulin (human)
A10AB02 Insulin (beef)
A10AB03 Insulin (pork)
A10AB04 Insulin lispro
A10AB05 Insulin aspart
A10AB06 Insulin glulisine
A10AB30 Combinations

A10AC Insulins and analogues for injection, intermediate-acting
A10AC01 Insulin (human)
A10AC02 Insulin (beef)
A10AC03 Insulin (pork)
A10AC04 Insulin lispro
A10AC30 Combinations

A10AD Insulins and analogues for injection, intermediate- or long-acting combined with fast-acting
A10AD01 Insulin (human)
A10AD02 Insulin (beef)
A10AD03 Insulin (pork)
A10AD04 Insulin lispro
A10AD05 Insulin aspart
A10AD06 Insulin degludec and insulin aspart
A10AD30 Combinations

A10AE Insulins and analogues for injection, long-acting
A10AE01 Insulin (human)
A10AE02 Insulin (beef)
A10AE03 Insulin (pork)
A10AE04 Insulin glargine
A10AE05 Insulin detemir
A10AE06 Insulin degludec
A10AE30 Combinations
A10AE54 Insulin glargine and lixisenatide
A10AE56 Insulin degludec and liraglutide

A10AF Insulins and analogues for inhalation
A10AF01 Insulin (human)

A10B Blood glucose lowering drugs, excluding insulins

A10BA Biguanides
A10BA01 Phenformin
A10BA02 Metformin
A10BA03 Buformin

A10BB Sulfonylureas
A10BB01 Glibenclamide
A10BB02 Chlorpropamide
A10BB03 Tolbutamide
A10BB04 Glibornuride
A10BB05 Tolazamide
A10BB06 Carbutamide
A10BB07 Glipizide
A10BB08 Gliquidone
A10BB09 Gliclazide
A10BB10 Metahexamide
A10BB11 Glisoxepide
A10BB12 Glimepiride
A10BB31 Acetohexamide

A10BC Sulfonamides (heterocyclic)
A10BC01 Glymidine

A10BD Combinations of oral blood glucose lowering drugs
A10BD01 Phenformin and sulfonylureas
A10BD02 Metformin and sulfonylureas
A10BD03 Metformin and rosiglitazone
A10BD04 Glimepiride and rosiglitazone
A10BD05 Metformin and pioglitazone
A10BD06 Glimepiride and pioglitazone
A10BD07 Metformin and sitagliptin
A10BD08 Metformin and vildagliptin
A10BD09 Pioglitazone and alogliptin
A10BD10 Metformin and saxagliptin
A10BD11 Metformin and linagliptin 
A10BD12 Pioglitazone and sitagliptin
A10BD13 Metformin and alogliptin
A10BD14 Metformin and repaglinide
A10BD15 Metformin and dapagliflozin
A10BD16 Metformin and canagliflozin
A10BD17 Metformin and acarbose
A10BD18 Metformin and gemigliptin
A10BD19 Linagliptin and empagliflozin
A10BD20 Metformin and empagliflozin
A10BD21 Saxagliptin and dapagliflozin
A10BD22 Metformin and evogliptin
A10BD23 Metformin and ertugliflozin
A10BD24 Sitagliptin and ertugliflozin
A10BD25 Metformin, saxagliptin and dapagliflozin
A10BD26 Metformin and lobeglitazone
A10BD27 Metformin, linagliptin and empagliflozin

A10BF Alpha glucosidase inhibitors
A10BF01 Acarbose
A10BF02 Miglitol
A10BF03 Voglibose

A10BG Thiazolidinediones
A10BG01 Troglitazone
A10BG02 Rosiglitazone
A10BG03 Pioglitazone
A10BG04 Lobeglitazone

A10BH Dipeptidyl peptidase 4 (DPP-4) inhibitors
A10BH01 Sitagliptin
A10BH02 Vildagliptin
A10BH03 Saxagliptin
A10BH04 Alogliptin
A10BH05 Linagliptin
A10BH06 Gemigliptin
A10BH07 Evogliptin
A10BH08 Teneligliptin
A10BH51 Sitagliptin and simvastatin
A10BH52 Gemigliptin and rosuvastatin

A10BJ Glucagon-like peptide-1 (GLP-1) analogues
A10BJ01 Exenatide
A10BJ02 Liraglutide
A10BJ03 Lixisenatide
A10BJ04 Albiglutide
A10BJ05 Dulaglutide
A10BJ06 Semaglutide
A10BJ07 Beinaglutide

A10BK Sodium-glucose co-transporter 2 (SGLT2) inhibitors
A10BK01 Dapagliflozin
A10BK02 Canagliflozin
A10BK03 Empagliflozin
A10BK04 Ertugliflozin
A10BK05 Ipragliflozin
A10BK06 Sotagliflozin
A10BK07 Luseogliflozin
QA10BK90 Velagliflozin

A10BX Other blood glucose lowering drugs, excluding insulins
A10BX01 Guar gum
A10BX02 Repaglinide
A10BX03 Nateglinide
A10BX05 Pramlintide
A10BX06 Benfluorex
A10BX08 Mitiglinide
A10BX15 Imeglimin
A10BX16 Tirzepatide
A10BX17 Carfloglitazar
A10BX18 Dorzagliatin

A10X Other drugs used in diabetes

A10XA Aldose reductase inhibitors
A10XA01 Tolrestat

References

A10